Between Two Worlds is a 1919 German silent drama film directed by Adolf Gärtner and starring Olga Engl, Bruno Kastner, and Lucie Mannheim.

Plot summary

Cast

References

Bibliography

External links
 

1919 films
Films of the Weimar Republic
Films directed by Adolf Gärtner
German silent feature films
German black-and-white films
German drama films
1919 drama films
Silent drama films
1910s German films
1910s German-language films